Adrien Barrier (7 March 1891 – 29 July 1915) was a French wrestler. He competed in the middleweight event at the 1912 Summer Olympics.

References

External links
 

1891 births
1915 deaths
Olympic wrestlers of France
Wrestlers at the 1912 Summer Olympics
French male sport wrestlers
Sportspeople from Puy-de-Dôme